Garhi Kapura (گڑھی کپورہ) Garhi Kapura is one of the most important towns of District Mardan.

Garhi Kapura (گڑھی کپورہ) Garhi Kapura is one of the most important towns of District Mardan.

References

 Populated places in Mardan District